"Alias the Spider" is a superhero feature from the Golden Age of Comic Books that appeared in Quality Comics' Crack Comics for nearly three years, starting with issue #1 in 1940. He was created by writer-artist Paul Gustavson.

The original Golden Age version of the character is in the public domain, but the rights to all subsequent versions are currently owned by DC Comics.

Publication history
Only one adventure of the Spider has ever been reprinted by DC Comics, which acquired the Quality Comics stable of characters when that company went out of business in 1956: the story from Crack Comics #25, in Detective Comics #441.

The Spider later made sporadic cameo appearances in All-Star Squadron and The Young All-Stars. As a Quality Comics character, he was one of the heroes who went with Uncle Sam to protect Earth-X during World War II, becoming part of the Freedom Fighters. This was the fulfillment of a storyline that began in Justice League of America #107-108, which introduced most of Quality Comics' characters to the DC Universe. Previously only Plastic Man and Blackhawk had been used.

Fictional character biography

Tom Hallaway
The Spider is playboy Tom Hallaway, who had tired of seeing criminals have their own way harassing and murdering honest citizens, so he adopts the guise of the Spider to settle the score. The Spider fights crime in a yellow shirt and blue shorts. He is armed with a bow and arrows, a special car known as the Black Widow, and the assistance of his valet Chuck (who helps Hallaway in both of his identities without anyone making any sort of connection). Hallaway uses a special arrow called the "Spider's Seal", which has a flat disc on the end; he shoots it at thugs' hands to disarm them.

According to Jess Nevins' Encyclopedia of Golden Age Superheroes, the Spider "fights enemies like the Crow, the pirate Falcon, Iggie the Yogi, and the Yellow Peril Yellow Scorpion".

In the continuity that followed DC Comics' "Crisis on Infinite Earths" company-crossover storyline, the Spider is not heroic. Now given the full name Tom Ludlow Hallaway, he did not become the Spider out of an altruistic motive, but rather because he was a smuggler, kidnapper and murderer who used the guise of a superhero as a cover to help him eliminate the competition. Though originally based in St. Louis, Missouri, he is a member of the Ludlow clan from New England. The family inadvertently ran up against the Shade, a near-immortal sometime-villain introduced during the 1930s-1940s Golden Age of Comic Books. The family had a history of ill-gotten gains, having originally amassed its vast wealth by killing their partners in a business enterprise.

Instead of working with the Freedom Fighters, this revised Spider is a member of the Seven Soldiers of Victory (also known as the Law's Legionnaires). Crisis on Infinite Earths had erased the Golden Age Green Arrow and Speedy from existence, and the Spider helped fill the void in the team. Shining Knight, the Vigilante and his partner Stuff, the original Star-Spangled Kid and Stripesy, and the Crimson Avenger were on board with the Spider. As depicted in Stars and S.T.R.I.P.E. #9, during the final case of the Seven Soldiers, the Spider betrays them to their old enemy, the Iron Hand (who had created the cosmic menace known as the Nebula Man). The Spider kills the Vigilante's friend Billy Gunn, but is stopped by the Crimson Avenger's partner Wing, who stops the Nebula Man (though at the cost of his own life).

With the only people who knew him to be a criminal dead, the Spider continues his heroic facade. He becomes the hero-in-residence of Keystone City after the Flash retired in 1950, but his Ludlow heritage catches up with him, as does the Shade. The Spider had been planning to face the Shade for quite a while. He had saved fragments of the Shade's shadow substance, intending to plant them at the scene of a double murder, that of Jay Garrick (the Golden Age Flash) and his wife Joan. The Spider hoped to lessen the Shade's power by keeping him captive near a roaring fireplace, but the added light only increased the shadows. The Shade creates arrow-casting monsters that shoot the Spider with black arrows. The Shade is able to prevent the Garricks' murders, but convinces his old enemy the Flash not to publicize his role.

Lucas Ludlow-Dalt
The Spider's son, Lucas Ludlow-Dalt, takes up the bow and arrow (and his original yellow and blue costume) in the pages of Starman, helping Culp, the Mist, the Rag Doll, Doctor Phosphorus, Solomon Grundy and several other villains lay siege to Opal City during the "Grand Guignol" storyline. This Spider had trained all his life for revenge on the Shade, and comes close to getting it. Matt O'Dare prevents the Spider from killing the Shade, and he is chased off to parts unknown. Lucas later attempts to kill Jack Knight in the final issue of Starman (and nearly kills Mason O'Dare, if not for the timely intervention of the spirit of the deceased magician Zatara). The Shade tells Jack Knight he is going to bring him in, since he is a Ludlow.

Stars and S.T.R.I.P.E. #9 also depicted the beginning of vengeful activity for another Spider, though this may be the same Spider that was depicted in Starman.

The Spider takes up his bow again in the pages of the most recent Hawkman series, facing off against Hawkman, Hawkgirl and Green Arrow. The Green Arrow shoots the Spider in his aiming eye with an arrow, hoping to end the criminal's career by maiming him. The Spider manages to re-learn archery from a new perspective (and far quicker than is usual for any normal human).

I, Spyder
Seven Soldiers #0 featured the advent of yet another Spider, although he spelled the name "I, Spyder". This character, named Thomas Ludlow Dalt, was one of the five heroes brought together by the Vigilante to form a new incarnation of the Seven Soldiers of Victory. Prior to this, he was abducted by the Seven Unknown Men of Slaughter Swamp after accepting a contract to kill them at their home base in the aforementioned bog. It was revealed that the Seven had hired him in order to lure him into their headquarters so they could hopefully prepare him to defeat the Sheeda (though one character criticised recruiting 'another schmuck with a bow and arrows'). Thomas was given several augmentations in terms of his abilities and gear which included new clothes, a jet-black helicopter with a black widow hourglass symbol on its base as well as 'cold blood and perfect aim'. This Spyder is also the son of Thomas Hallaway, and the brother of Lucas, who usurps the identity by killing his brother. His glory is short lived however, as he is killed by the evil Sheeda and resurrected as their agent.

This Spyder was not actually villainous like his father. After a failed assassination attempt on Bulleteer's life, Spyder was greeted by the ghost of Greg Saunders, the original Vigilante. What occurred during their confrontation is not shown but in Seven Soldiers #1, Spyder shoots the Sheeda queen Gloriana Tenebrae, knocking her from her floating castle, and she is hit and killed by a car driven by the Bulleteer.

References

External links
 Spider I Profile
 DCU Guide: Spider
 DCU Guide: Spider
 DCU Guide: I, Spyder
"Alias the Spider" at Don Markstein's Toonopedia. Archived from the original on April 4, 2012.

DC Comics superheroes
DC Comics supervillains
Fictional archers
Golden Age superheroes
Quality Comics superheroes
Comics characters introduced in 1940
Comics characters introduced in 1998
Comics characters introduced in 2005
Public domain comics
Characters created by Grant Morrison
Characters created by James Robinson
Characters created by Geoff Johns